Raphael Xavier Williams (born December 7, 1970) is known as an Inmoc-ographer (innovative movement conceptualist). He is a professional breaker/dancer, rapper, music producer, comedian, photographer, author and multifaceted artist. He is known for re-invigorating the B-boying community in Philadelphia. He started choreographing dance with the Brandywine School of Ballet in 1995. He then became recognized as a theatre artist when he joined Rennie Harris Puremovement, the longest running Hip-Hop dance company, in their production of Rome & Jewels in 1997. He moved to the role of Tybalt shortly after. He would continue on to become a core member of the RHPM company and is now an alumnus. He has received many awards and recognition for his choreographic work from 1999 to the present and for various projects he has worked on including: music recordings and compositions, film, and photography. Raphael gives lectures and dance classes internationally on Hip-Hop and its history. In 2013, Raphael was honored with a Pew Fellowships in the Arts award. He is a 2016 Guggenheim fellow and a 2016 United States Artist Knight fellow. He is also An appointed professor at Princeton University teaching special topics in hip hop dance with a focus on Breaking.

The Early Years 

Raphael Xavier was born in Wilmington, Delaware where he began his Hip-Hop dance journey and initiation into the culture. After seeing the New York City Breakers on the hit TV show Soul Train in 1983, Raphael began Breaking with fellow students at Conrad Middle School. While it quickly grew into a phenomenon, at the same time, it became hazardous to students and a liability to the institutions. Schools world wide banned the dance, forbidding students from practicing the form. Expulsion ensued and Raphael began hiding during school hours to practice the dance. Raphael was one of the few students to stick with it and turned the dreams of becoming a member of the famous "Scanner Boys" of Philly into a reality as he would work closely with their crew leader, Lorenzo-Prince Scarecrow-Rennie Harris, founder of Rennie Harris Puremovement.

Dance career 

Xavier first got his start in the dance industry by choreographing a piece for the Brandywine School of Ballet in 1995 after he was approached by Monarae Fraim to work with the school. He moved to Philadelphia, Pennsylvania, in 1998 and ended up getting hired by Rennie Harris to tour as a dancer. He started traveling internationally with RHPM in a production called "Cool Heat Urban Beat," that included performances by: Urban Tap, RHPM, and DJ Miz. Raphael later performed and choreographed/produced his first evening length work as part of the CEC- New Edge Residency, in 2002 and founded a dance company called Olive Dance Theatre that same year. The company became a 501c3 non-profit, had a major funder and started touring within 2 months of its birth. In 2007, he left Olive Dance Theatre due to creative differences and a spine infection that left him temporarily paralyzed and without the use of his left side. That experience lead him to create a movement technique called Ground-Core, a Somatic dance technique that gives the dancer awareness of their body. It has been taught at the University of Milwaukee, the University of California Irvine, the Stoney Brook University and as a credited course at UCLA. It is now implemented in all of his teachings and residencies to help expand the vocabulary of all dancers. 
Raphael has established Breaking as a traditional folk art in Philadelphia.

Xavier’s most touring work, ‘The Unofficial Guide to Audience Watching Performance’, is an autobiographical work that has toured the U.S. 2013-2015. TUGTAWP is a full-length autobiographical dance that is the culmination of 30 years of experience in the breaking art form and the hip-hop genre. With structuring and creative direction by Ralph Lemon, this new work deconstructs Xavier’s rap lyrics and breaking technique and, through rap cadences delivered as conversation, gives the audience insight into the maturing practitioner’s life journey as well as context for viewing the artist’s work.

Photography career 
Xavier started his photography career by doing freelance photography for Rap Pages, Blaze and The Source (magazine). One of his most notable shoots was of a fight between The Notorious B.I.G. along with his camp and an audience member that climbed on stage. He also shot events for P. Diddy and his Bad Boy Records Crew in their early stages. 
Raphael has an ongoing photography project, "No Bicycle Parking," that documents over 15 years of abandoned bicycles from around the world. It was featured in Bike Magazine 2003, the Sweeney Art Gallery's Re-Cycle-Bike Culture exhibit in 2010, The Painted Bride Art Center in 2013, Philadelphia's City Hall and several major on line publications. He sells large prints and published a book also entitled 'No Bicycle Parking'.

In addition to photography, Raphael wrote and directed a documentary film shot in Rio de Janeiro in 2007-2008 called "Chamber of Echoes." The film won best documentary short in an online film contest held by Filmaka. "Chamber of Echoes" was premiered at the BlackStar Film Festival in 2012.

Rap career 
Raphael's rap interest began in 1986 after hearing Rakim's Check out My Melody and he began writing rap songs. By 1993, he started a rap group called the Sons of Sam and released a 12in single on the Workshop Records label, which became a collectors piece and was selling on EBay for $850.00 by the owners/collectors. 
Vinyl Addicts of Germany licensed the unreleased material in 2009. Promo-Only label then licensed the original 12in single in 2010 for a promo-only album.
Much of his recordings were recorded at the famous D&D Studios in NYC and the Up & Up Studios in N.J. He recorded a song with 1200 Techniques, an Australian hip hop group formed in 1997. The song was called Upsidedownunder and was released on the group's debut album, 'Choose One', which was released in 2002. Produced entirely by DJ Peril, the album features a mix of contemporary hip-hop, rock and electro.
In 2011 he was commissioned by Alvin Ailey American Dance Company to create an original composition for a new piece that was choreographed by longtime peer and mentor Dr. Lorenzo 'Rennie' Harris called Home. And in 2015 he teamed up with Harris for a second time for Exodus, a new house and gospel work for Alvin Ailey. Available on iTunes. 

Rap Alias': 
The Xav
Henry Bemis
Archie Rays
Viazeen
Z-NO-Zeen

List of Music/Records
Oooh he got an afro 93
Wry Penmen 96
The Man with the glass eyes 99
Circle Traffic 2004-2005
The Unbirth 2009
Oooh he got an afro re-issue 2010

He wrote and scored an original composition for a work choreographed by Rennie Harris for Alvin Ailey Dance Theatre, called "Home."

Raphael was part of the only winning team to clear the blind wall in the short lived T.V. game show Hole in the Wall (U.S. game show) and won $50,000.

References

American breakdancers
1970 births
Living people
American male dancers
MacDowell Colony fellows